Harry Adams may refer to:
 Harry Adams (basketball), head basketball coach at DePaul University, 1924–1925
 Harry B. Adams, (born 1924), fifth chaplain of Yale University
 Harry Adams (sport shooter) (1880–1968), American Olympic sport shooter
 Harry Adams (footballer) (1855–1910), Druids F.C. and Wales international footballer
 Harry Adams (baseball umpire) (1863–1941), Major League Baseball umpire
 Harry Adams (cricket umpire) (1881–1946), South African cricket umpire
 Harry Adams (sprinter) (born 1989), American sprinter
 Harry Adams (photographer) (1918–1985), African-American photographer

See also
Henry Adams (disambiguation)
Harold Adams (disambiguation)